Colus pubescens, common name the hairy colus, is a species of sea snail, a marine gastropod mollusk in the family Colidae, the true whelks abd the like.

Description

Distribution

References

 Abbott, R. T. (1974). American seashells. The marine Mollusca of the Atlantic and Pacific coast of North America. ed. 2. Van Nostrand, New York. 663 pp., 24 pls.
 Turgeon, D., Quinn, J. F., Bogan, A. E., Coan, E. V., Hochberg, F. G., Lyons, W. G., Mikkelsen, P. M., Neves, R. J., Roper, C. F. E., Rosenberg, G., Roth, B., Scheltema, A., Thompson, F. G., Vecchione, M., Williams, J. D. (1998). Common and scientific names of aquatic invertebrates from the United States and Canada: mollusks. 2nd ed. American Fisheries Society Special Publication, 26. American Fisheries Society: Bethesda, MD (USA). ISBN 1-888569-01-8. IX, 526 + cd-rom pp.
 Gosner, K. L. (1971). Guide to identification of marine and estuarine invertebrates: Cape Hatteras to the Bay of Fundy. John Wiley & Sons, Inc., London. 693 pp.
 Linkletter, L. E. (1977). A checklist of marine fauna and flora of the Bay of Fundy. Huntsman Marine Laboratory, St. Andrews, N.B. 68: p

External links
 Verrill, A.E. (1882). Catalogue of marine Mollusca added to the fauna of the New England region, during the past ten years. Transactions of the Connecticut Academy of Arts and Sciences. 5(2): 447-587, pls 42-44, 57-58
 Bouchet, P. & Warén, A. (1985). Revision of the Northeast Atlantic bathyal and abyssal Neogastropoda excluding Turridae (Mollusca, Gastropoda). Bollettino Malacologico. supplement 1: 121-296
 Trott, T. J. (2004). Cobscook Bay inventory: a historical checklist of marine invertebrates spanning 162 years. Northeastern Naturalist. 11, 261-324.

Colidae
Gastropods described in 1882